This is a list of the 54 members of the European Parliament for Spain in the 2004 to 2009 session.

List

Notes

External links
 List of the 54 MEPs from Spain with Photos on one page and links for more

Spain 2004-2009
List
2004-2009